The Sendero station is a station on the Monterrey Metro. It is located in Escobedo, and is the northern terminal of Line 2. The station was opened on 1 October 2008 as the northern terminus of the extension of the line from Universidad.

See also
List of Monterrey metro stations

References

Metrorrey stations
Railway stations opened in 2008